Walter Bénéteau (28 July 1972 – 10 December 2022) was a French professional cyclist. He raced in every Tour de France from 2000 until 2006.

Career
Stage 1 of the 2006 Tour de France started with a seven-man break-away with Bénéteau being the last man caught with 7km to go after spending 177km out in front. During Stage 6 Bénéteau was hit in the face by Spaniard David de la Fuente causing his glasses and helmet to go flying. Then in Stage 9 Bénéteau was part of an initial 3-man break-away, caught with only 10km to the finish line. During this stage he won all three intermediate sprint points, moving him to 23rd in the Points classification. Bénéteau's final Grand Tour was the 2006 Vuelta a España; he finished first in the main peloton bunch sprint in stage 11, 15 minutes down on winner Egoi Martínez. He finished 83rd overall in his final Grand Tour.

Death
Bénéteau died on 10 December 2022 in a hotel room in Bali, Indonesia. The circumstances of his death have not yet been released by local authorities.

Major results
Sources:

1996
 3rd Tro-Bro Léon
1997
 1st Tour du Finistère
1999
 7th Tour du Doubs
2000
 1st Châteauroux Classic
 1st Boucles de l'Aulne
 3rd GP Ouest-France
 3rd Trophée des Grimpeurs
 10th Tour de Berne
2001
 2nd Road race, National Road Championships
2002
 2nd Tour de Vendée
 2nd Tro-Bro Léon
 8th Trophée des Grimpeurs
2003
 1st Boucles de l'Aulne
 3rd La Poly Normande
 8th Overall Tour du Limousin
 8th Grand Prix d'Ouverture La Marseillaise
 8th Grand Prix de Wallonie
 9th Tour de Vendée
2004
 9th Road race, National Road Championships
2005
 3rd Bordeaux-Caudéran
2006
 2nd Boucles de l'Aulne
 4th Trophée des Grimpeurs

Grand Tour general classification results timeline
Sources:

References

External links

1972 births
2022 deaths
Sportspeople from Vendée
French male cyclists
Tour de Guadeloupe winners
Cyclists from Pays de la Loire